The Pittsfield Electrics were a Canadian–American League (Class C) baseball team in Pittsfield, Massachusetts from 1941 to 1951. From 1949 to 1950 they played as the Pittsfield Indians and in 1951 as the Pittsfield Phillies.

Their home field was Wahconah Park.

Future Major League Electrics

Jorge Comellas (1941)
John O'Neil (1942)
Al Rosen (1946)
Hal Naragon (1947)
Jim Lemon (1948)
Brooks Lawrence (1950)
Stan Pawloski (1950)
Dick Tomanek (1950)

Electrics with previous Major League experience
Bill Holland (1941)
Glenn Spencer (1941)
Tony Rensa (1946–1947)
Gene Hasson (1948–1949)
Lloyd Brown (1950)

References

Canadian–American League (C) Encyclopedia and History

1941 establishments in Massachusetts
1951 disestablishments in Massachusetts
Baseball teams disestablished in 1951
Baseball teams established in 1941
Canadian American Association of Professional Baseball teams
Defunct baseball teams in Massachusetts
Baseball teams in Pittsfield, Massachusetts
Professional baseball teams in Massachusetts